Georgia's location, nestled between the Black Sea, Russia, and Turkey, renders it strategically important. It is developing as the gateway from the Black Sea to the Caucasus and the larger Caspian region, but also serves as a buffer between Russia and Turkey. Georgia has a long and tumultuous relationship with Russia, but it is reaching out to its other neighbours and looking to the West in search of alternatives and opportunities. It signed a partnership and cooperation agreement with the European Union, participates in the Partnership for Peace, and encourages foreign investment. France, Germany, South Korea the United Kingdom and the United States all have embassies in Tbilisi. Georgia in 2004-2008 sought to become a member of NATO, but did not succeed in the face of strong Russian opposition.

Georgia is a member of the United Nations, the Council of Europe, and the OSCE. Because of its strategic location, Georgia is in both the Russian and American spheres of influence, however Georgia's relationship with Russia is at its lowest point since 1921 due to controversies regarding espionage and the Russo-Georgian War. As a result, Georgia broke off diplomatic relations with Russia and has left the Commonwealth of Independent States. From 2008 until 2012, Georgia established diplomatic relations with about 50 states.

Current missions

Africa

Americas

Asia

Europe

Oceania

Multilateral organizations

Gallery

See also 
 Foreign relations of Georgia

Notes

References
 Ministry Foreign Affairs of Georgia

 
Georgia
Diplomatic missions